Natalie (minor planet designation: 448 Natalie) is a typical Main belt asteroid.

It was discovered by Max Wolf and A. Schwassmann on 27 October 1899 in Heidelberg.

References

External links
 
 

Background asteroids
Natalie
Natalie
Natalie
C-type asteroids (Tholen)
18991027